Afghanistan and Mexico hold diplomatic relations, both being members of the United Nations and the World Trade Organization.

History 
Due to a vast distance between Afghanistan and Mexico, the relation between the two nations never developed into one of high priority. Both nations established diplomatic relations with each other on the 27 June 1961. Since then, bilateral relations between both nations are mainly conducted in international forums such as at the United Nations.

In 1962, Mexico accredited its first ambassador to Afghanistan, resident in New Delhi, India. The ambassador was Nobel Prize winner Octavio Paz. During Paz's time as ambassador in India, he kept a journal of his travels to Afghanistan writing about his journey from New Delhi to Kabul and his experiences and he documented presenting his credentials to former Afghan King Mohammed Zahir Shah. Paz turned his journal  into a book called "Viento Entero."

From 1980 to 1981, Mexico was on the United Nations Security Council and voted in favor of Resolution 462 condemning the Soviet invasion of Afghanistan. The Resolution was adopted. When Mexico was again a member of the UN Security Council from 2002 to 2003; it voted on numerous occasions in favor of maintaining Afghanistan's independence and sovereignty of the country (Resolution 1444 and Resolution 1453) and extending the UN Assistance Mission mandate in the country (Resolution 1471). From 2009 to 2010, Mexico again as a non-permanent member of the UN Security Council voted in favor of UN Resolution 1868 and UN Resolution 1890.

Since the beginning of the U.S led invasion of Afghanistan in 2001; many Afghan migrants have travelled to Mexico in order to enter the United States. Furthermore, several Mexican narcotic cartels have been operating in Afghanistan by using fake "front" companies to hire smugglers in the country to smuggle drugs and weapons from Afghanistan to Europe and the United States.

Throughout the years, several Afghan migrants have traveled through Mexico to reach the United States and are forced to wait in Mexico while their U.S. asylum cases are reviewed and processed.

In August 2021, with the return of control of the Taliban in Afghanistan; Mexico announced it would issue refugee visas to Afghan refugees, in particular women and children, from its embassy in Tehran, Iran and resettle them in Mexico. Immediately afterwards, over 100 Afghan refugees arrived to Mexico. Afghanistan's embassy in the United States was accredited to Mexico until it closed on March 16, 2022. The Mexican Embassy in Tehran is accredited to Afghanistan.

Trade
In 2018, bilateral trade between Afghanistan and Mexico amounted to US$9 million. Afghanistan is Mexico's 165th biggest global trading partner while at the same time, Mexico is Afghanistan's 63rd biggest trading partner. Afghanistan's main exports to Mexico include: mobile phones, machine and automobile parts. Mexico's main exports to Afghanistan include: refrigerators, beer, plastic and silicone.

Diplomatic missions
 Mexico is accredited to Afghanistan from its embassy in Tehran, Iran.

References

 
Mexico
Bilateral relations of Mexico